Anders Evensen (2 March 1915 – 24 March 1988) was a Norwegian sailor. He was born in Kristiania. He competed at the 1948 Summer Olympics in London, where he placed fourth in the 6 metre class, together with Magnus Konow, Ragnar Hargreaves, Håkon Solem and Lars Musæus.

References

External links

1915 births
1988 deaths
Sportspeople from Oslo
Norwegian male sailors (sport)
Olympic sailors of Norway
Sailors at the 1948 Summer Olympics – 6 Metre